Chairmen of the Cocos (Keeling) Islands Council

Presidents of the Shire of Cocos Council
The office was known as the "President of the Cocos (Keeling) Islands Shire Council" prior to 2004.

Sources
World Statesmen.org
Shire of Cocos home page

Politics of the Cocos (Keeling) Islands
Australia politics-related lists
Leaders of Shire Council